This was the second of seven editions of the tournament in the 2021 tennis season. Illya Marchenko was the defending champion but lost in the quarterfinals to Andreas Seppi.

Kwon Soon-woo won the title after defeating Lorenzo Musetti 6–2, 6–3 in the final.

Seeds

Draw

Finals

Top half

Bottom half

References

External links
Main draw
Qualifying draw

Biella Challenger Indoor II - 1